Grosvenor Road station was a railway station in London located at the north end of Grosvenor Bridge on the approach tracks to Victoria station.

Victoria station was originally operated as two separate parts served by the London, Chatham and Dover Railway (LC&DR) and the London, Brighton and South Coast Railway (LB&SCR) and Grosvenor Road station was also operated in this way. The LC&DR station operated between 1867 and 1911 and the LB&SCR station operated between 1870 and 1907.

The station building of the LC&DR station remains on the eastern side of the tracks adjacent to Grosvenor Road (A3212) although no platforms remain at the elevated track level.

References

External links 
abandonedstations.org.uk - Grosvenor Road

Disused railway stations in the City of Westminster
Former London, Brighton and South Coast Railway stations
Former London, Chatham and Dover Railway stations
Railway stations in Great Britain opened in 1867
Railway stations in Great Britain closed in 1911
Grade II listed buildings in the City of Westminster
Grade II listed railway stations